Green Arrow has been featured in many ongoing series, limited series and graphic novels published by DC Comics. These titles have been handled or coordinated through a single editorial section at DC Comics. This section also generally handles titles that have spun off of the core Green Arrow titles to feature related characters. This list presents these titles separated by general type of publication.

Ongoing series

Annuals

Limited series

One-shots and graphic novels

Collected editions 
The trade paperback edition of The Archer's Quest (#16–21) was released as Volume 4 in the series after Straight Shooter (#26–31) was released as Volume 3. The hardcover editions of Quiver, The Sounds Of Violence, as well as The Archer's Quest were never numbered.

Beginnings and Team-Up with Green Lantern

Green Arrow Return

Green Arrow/Black Canary

Brightest Day

The New 52

Rebirth

Miscellaneous collections

References

External links

The Trade Paperback List: Green Arrow
 Green Arrow at the DC Database Project
 Green Arrow's secret origin at DC Comics.com
 Earth-1 Green Arrow Index
 Earth-2 Green Arrow Index
 Index of the Earth-One adventures of Green Arrow
 Green Arrow at Don Markstein's Toonopedia. Archived from the original on August 29, 2016.
 

Green Arrow
Green Arrow

Green Arrow